The 2006 UCI Road World Championships took place in Salzburg, Austria, between September 19 and September 24, 2006. The event consisted of a road race and a time trial for men, women and men under 23.

The Men's road race saw Italian Olympic champion Paolo Bettini triumph, while Swiss Fabian Cancellara won his first time trial world title.

The women's road race title was won by Marianne Vos, in her first year of racing at senior level.

Participating nations
A total of 574 cyclists from 54 national federations participated. The number of cyclists per nation that competed is shown in parentheses.

Events summary

Medals table

External links

Official website
Results

See also
2006 World University Cycling Championship

 
UCI Road World Championships by year
Uci Road World Championships, 2006
International cycle races hosted by Austria
September 2006 sports events in Europe